Jhumair or Jhumar is an Indian folk dance from the Indian states of Jharkhand, Odisha, Chhattisgarh, Bihar and  West Bengal. It is folk dance of Sadan, the Indo-Aryan ethnic groups of Chotanagpur. It is mainly performed during harvest season. 
The musical instruments used are Mandar, Dhol, Nagara, Bansuri.

Varieties 
The Jhumair/Jhumar from different region vary from each other in style.
There are variety of Jhumar in the region of Chotanagpur such as:
Khortha Jhumar 
Kurmali Jhumar
Panch Pargarnia Jhumar
Nagpuri Jhumar
Mardani Jhumar
Janani Jhumar

Notable exponent
 Govind Sharan Lohra, folk artist from Jharkhand
 Mukund Nayak, folk artist from Jharkhand

See also
Circle dance

References 

Indian folk dances
Dances of India
Folk dances of Jharkhand
Nagpuri culture
Folk dances of Chhattisgarh
Folk dances of Odisha
Folk dances of Bihar
Folk dances of West Bengal
Circle dances